Gümüş railway station is a railway station in near the village of Hasangazi, Niğde in Turkey. The station is located between the D.750 state highway to the north and the Çakıtsuyu creek to the south.

TCDD Taşımacılık operates two daily intercity trains from Konya and Kayseri to Adana.

References

External links
TCDD Taşımacılık
Passenger trains
Gümüş station timetable

Railway stations in Niğde Province